Liberal Students Federation (LSF) is a student federation in Pakistan created by a split from the National Students Federation in 1973. It has branches in all major Colleges and Universities in Pakistan.

It has had a very big part to play in student developments recently along with the NSF to both strengthen and orient towards social Democratic positions of the newly formed Insaaf Student Federation (ISF) which is now aligned with the PTI and is fighting against the overthrow of General Mashraaf's military junta and very vocal support with the pro-lawyers movement to restore the independent judiciary.

References

See also
List of student federations of Pakistan

Students' federations of Pakistan
Liberal parties in Pakistan